Haris Harba (born 14 July 1988) is a Bosnian footballer who plays for FC Petržalka as a forward.

Club career

FK Kukësi
After joining FK Kukësi in the summer 2018, Harba left the club again already at the end of the year.

FK Blansko
On 29 January 2020, it was confirmed that Harba had joined FK Blansko.

International career
Harba made his international debut for Bosnia and Herzegovina on 16 December 2011, in a 1–0 loss against Poland in a friendly match. It was an unofficial game though, between a Polish team of local league players and a Bosnian Olympic team.

Career statistics

References

External links
 
 
 

1988 births
Living people
People from Foča
Association football forwards
Bosnia and Herzegovina footballers
FK Bosna Sarajevo players
FK Olimpik players
FC Hradec Králové players
FC Vysočina Jihlava players
FC Spartak Trnava players
FK Sarajevo players
FC Fastav Zlín players
Bucheon FC 1995 players
Büyükşehir Belediye Erzurumspor footballers
FC ViOn Zlaté Moravce players
FK Kukësi players
1. FC Slovácko players
MFK Vyškov players
FK Blansko players
KF Bylis Ballsh players
FC Petržalka players
Premier League of Bosnia and Herzegovina players
Czech First League players
Slovak Super Liga players
2. Liga (Slovakia) players
Czech National Football League players
K League 2 players
TFF First League players
Kategoria Superiore players
Bosnia and Herzegovina expatriate footballers
Expatriate footballers in the Czech Republic
Bosnia and Herzegovina expatriate sportspeople in the Czech Republic
Expatriate footballers in Slovakia
Bosnia and Herzegovina expatriate sportspeople in Slovakia
Expatriate footballers in South Korea
Bosnia and Herzegovina expatriate sportspeople in South Korea
Expatriate footballers in Turkey
Bosnia and Herzegovina expatriate sportspeople in Turkey
Expatriate footballers in Albania
Bosnia and Herzegovina expatriate sportspeople in Albania